Jin Zhanpeng (6 November 1938 – 27 November 2020) was a Chinese scientist specializing in phase diagram and powder metallurgy. He was a member of the Communist Party of China. He was an academician of the Chinese Academy of Sciences (CAS).

Biography
Jin was born in Lipu, Guangxi, on November 6, 1938. After graduating from Central South University in 1960, he taught at the university. He returned to China in 1981 and continued to teach at Central South University. In 1998, he suddenly fell ill and was paralyzed after rescue. He died of illness in Changsha, Hunan, on November 27, 2020, aged 82.

Honours and awards
 1991 State Natural Science Award (Third Class) 
 November 25, 2003 Member of the Chinese Academy of Sciences (CAS)

References

1938 births
2020 deaths
People from Guilin
Chemists from Guangxi
Central South University alumni
Academic staff of the Central South University
Members of the Chinese Academy of Sciences